During World War I, Ethiopia briefly formed an alliance with the Allied Powers (Britain, France and Italy) after Italy entered the war in 1915. There was a dynastic battle within Ethiopia after the uncrowned Emperor, Lij Iyasu, allegedly converted to Islam at the behest of the Ottoman Empire in June 1916 and the British and French legates in Addis Ababa concerned a venture. This led to a coup d'état by regent Ras Tafari Mekonnen, later Emperor Haile Selassie, in September, and installed Empress Zewditu, who maintained neutrality throughout the war.

In May 1918, the Allies praised the Ethiopian diplomatic missions to Rome, Paris and London. France supported Ethiopia's sovereignty and admission to League of Nations, despite Britain and Italy being bluntly opposed to it. In 1923, Ethiopia joined the League of Nations and presided over strong diplomatic missions to ensure its sovereignty.

Background
Since the Middle Ages, Christian Ethiopia had maintained strong foreign relations with European monarchs, with embassies frequently exchanged with Portugal, Vatican and Russia. In 1841, the first Anglo-Ethiopian Agreement was signed following British presence in Aden. During the late 19th century, under the European powers’ international law, Ethiopia was entered into the "family of nations," unlike other African nations. In 1884, Negus Menelik II signed the Hewett Treaty with Britain to access the British sphere of influence on the Nile. He also signed a treaty with Italy in 1889 following Eritrea's takeover by Italy for warm relations between the two nations. Historians argued that the rapprochement between Menelik and European powers was "Ethiopia's success...to have actively participated as the only African state in the partitioning of the continent", with Menelik treating himself as equal to his European "brothers".

The dispute over the Treaty of Wuchale, caused by misinterpretation of the Italian word for “protectorate” over Ethiopia, which the Emperor Menelik disputed, led to the Battle of Adwa in 1896. Following the Ethiopian army’s defeat of Italy and Ethiopia’s re-secured sovereignty, Menelik embarked on competing with neighboring European powers, Britain, Italy and France, to benefit Ethiopia as well as to reinstate imperial power by implementing ministries in 1905 and 1906. Eight great powers, Great Britain, France, Italy, Russia, the United States, Germany, and Ottoman Empire set up legations to Addis Ababa and strengthened consular jurisdiction over Ethiopia. After that, Ethiopia apparently participated in mapping international politics in Western perception. In 1907, Ethiopian diplomatic missions commenced, to Budapest, Vienna, and Berlin.

In 1906, the British Minister to Addis Ababa, Sir Harrington, offered a memorandum to Menelik that petitioned to dispatch a European legal advisor to Ethiopia, which many historians considered an effort to create "semi-colonial" relations, or "semi-colonial control" over Ethiopia. In 1905, Ethiopia thoroughly equated with international community through diplomatic achievements such as establishing legation and signing numerous international conventions (only the Treaty of Wuchale remained in question to Italian nationals, who demanded a signing in Europe on behalf of the Emperor).

During the war

After the death of Menelik in 1913, uncrowned Emperor Lij Iyasu assumed power in Addis Ababa despite political opposition, with different preference over European influence, or replacing his power elsewise. In the beginning of the war, the French and British legates contended German counterpart by requesting support from the crown prince. Rumours were spread that Ethiopia would participate the world war out of consciousness and possibly would succeed accessing Red Sea of Italian Eritrea— because of diplomatic ties to Central Powers since 1882 by virtue of Triple Alliance—Ethiopia would attack Eritrea as the Italian feared.

In previous wars in Europe, Ethiopian elites used to multilateral approach in order to discriminate aligned states. Notwithstanding Ethiopia remained neutral as this action was disputed by foreign legates and the government of Ethiopia conformed to the Hague Convention "relative to the rights and duties of neutral powers and persons in case of the war on land" (1907). In August 1914, Allied legates exerted pressure on the Ethiopian government to bar citizens of the Central Powers in Ethiopia from using communication devices (post offices, telegraphs, Addis Ababa's only printing press), and the railway line to French Djibouti.
 
When Italy joined the Allied Powers in April 1915, all Ethiopia's neighbors were engaged in fighting Germany and its allies, the Ottoman Empire with Yemeni colony in opposite side of Red Sea. In 1915 and 1916, sympathy often expressed toward the faction of Central Powers in Ethiopia. The Central Powers determined to open new front against British in Sudan, Somalia, Libya, as well with Turkish support, the Anglo-Egyptian troops. It was important to this point that Ethiopians were delivering weapons to Sanussi and Mohammed Abdullah Hassan. The Central Powers in their raid against the Suez Canal promised to Ethiopia to dominate the sea's trading post that Lij Iyasu conquered it, after the war. The Germans also hoped to assuage  Paul von Lettow-Vorbeck's troops attacks in German East Africa.

The Allies were aware of the German and Turkish plan to use pan-Islamist rhetoric and propaganda  in the Arab world. In June 1916, Turkish Consul Ahmed Mazher bey distributed leaflets in Addis Ababa stating "[t]he interests of Islam in this country concur with those of the Abyssinian Government". Concerns were rumored that the crown prince would convert religion to Islam or had already converted. In addition, Lij Iyasu's cordial relationship with the Turkish consul and Muslim notables in Harar and Somalia created fear in the British and French legations. Although the Ethiopian Minister of War declared Ethiopia a neutral country, Lij Iyasu seemed to bet on the victory of the Central Powers. The British continued swaying the neutrals towards Allied Powers by providing troops, and facilitated using Lij Iyasu's cousin Ras Tafari Mekonnen (later Emperor Haile Selassie) as power broker. He was a competitor of Lij Iyasu and carried out a successful coup d'état on 26 September 1916. The coup was supported by Allied Powers, who alleged Lij Iyasu had converted to Islam despite the lack of evidence of apostasy to conversion to Islam, "in no way suggests [s] a formal conversion" or that Iyasu gave up "Christian identity".

As Allies took control of the region in 1916, Ras Tafari Mekonnen learned of Lij Iyasu's alignment with Ottoman Turkey. Lij Iyasu was immediately arrested, but briefly escaped from prison before being captured and re-imprisoned. Upon Empress Zewditu's reign in 1916, the country underwent neutrality throughout the war, and the government banned Ethiopian troops from participating with the Allies per the Hague Convention in 1917.  The Ethiopian farmers proceeded to sell cattle to meat factories in Eritrea, en route to the Italians there. In May 1917, the German party from legation in Addis Ababa attempted to cross Red Sea in order to convey message with Turkish Army, where the French legate accused the Ethiopian government and subsequent Germans capture in Djibouti, of "flagrante violation de neutralité".

In June 1917, Ethiopia, under the pressure of Ras Tafari Mekonnen ceased legate to Central Powers, but demanded 16,000 modern rifles. The Italian convinced their allies that the friendly neutral Ethiopia was important but feared making unwanted claims regarding its sovereignty during peace negotiations. Thus, Ethiopia's offer declined thereafter. In late 1918, the Ethiopian government congratulated the Allied victory but the German legate still remained unclosed. In May 1918, the Allied praised the Ethiopian mission in Rome, Paris and London. While France favored Ethiopia to join League of Nations, Italy and Britain reluctantly opposed Ethiopian statehood. In 1923, Ethiopia admitted to League of Nations, the only independent African nation to do this, and continued strong diplomatic missions to maintain independence.

References

External links
 Ethiopia | International Encyclopedia of the First World War (WW1)
 The First World War from Tripoli to Addis Ababa (1911–1924)

History of Ethiopia
Battles involving Ethiopia
Haile Selassie
African theatre of World War I